The Nemio River is a tributary of the south shore of the Gouin Reservoir, flowing in the town of La Tuque, in the administrative region of Mauricie, in Quebec, in Canada.

The Nemio River flows successively into the townships of Tassé, Huguenin, Sulte, Chapman, Myrand and Lemay, on the southern shore of the Gouin Reservoir. Forestry is the main economic activity of this valley; recreational tourism activities, second.

The route 404, connecting the village of Clova, Quebec to the South Bay of Bureau Lake is connected to sub-road branches which serve the upper part of the Nemio River; this road connects to the south-east the route 400 which goes to Gouin Dam. Some secondary forest roads are in use nearby for forestry and recreational tourism activities.

The surface of the Nemio River is usually frozen from mid-November to the end of April, however, safe ice circulation is generally from early December to late March.

Geography

Toponymy 
The toponym "Nemio River" was formalized on December 5, 1968 at the Commission de toponymie du Québec, when it was created.

Notes and references

See also 

Rivers of Mauricie
Tributaries of the Saint-Maurice River
La Tuque, Quebec